Units in the City is the debut and only studio album by American hip hop recording artist Shawty Lo during his lifetime. It was released on February 26, 2008, by D4L Records, Asylum Records and Warner Bros. Records. The album features guest appearances from Phace Baity, Gucci Mane and G-Child, 40cal, Frontstreet and Braski with the production, which was provided by Balis Beats, DJ Montay and Bankhead DJ Pooh, among others.

The album was supported by three singles: "Dey Know", "Dunn Dunn" and "Foolish". Units in the City received negative reviews from critics, who found its production derivative and lyrical content devoid of mature topics.

Critical reception

The album received overwhelming negative reviews from music critics who despised the southern production and Shawty Lo's lyrical content. Steve 'Flash' Juon of RapReviews criticized the album for showcasing Lo's average delivery for simple subject matters, concluding that, "The production and lyrics here are so awful I'm actually longing for Soulja Boy's album." DJBooth's Nathan Slavik criticized Lo for aping other rappers' style and using them to tell the same cliché hip-hop stories, saying "[T]here's just no way around it, Units In The City is a horrible album. Period." Athorton of HipHopDX also criticized Lo for lacking a distinct delivery and trying to sound like T.I. and Jeezy, saying that "we certainly don't need another new rapper trying to remake their paths." AllMusic's David Jeffries was the sole positive review for the album, commenting on Lo's flow feeling limited but said that it complimented the numerous hip-hop story tracks and few deviations into mature subject matter, all while combining both snap and trap music saying that "with some fun wordplay and the talent to hire all the right people for production and guest appearances, he's created the best album."

Track listing

Charts

Weekly charts

Year-end charts

References

2008 debut albums
Shawty Lo albums
Asylum Records albums
Albums produced by DJ Pooh